Oflag VII-D was a World War II German prisoner-of-war camp for officers (Offizierlager) located in Tittmoning Castle in south-eastern Bavaria.

Camp history
The camp was opened as Oflag VII-D in February 1941, but in November 1941 became a sub-camp of Oflag VII-C, and was redesignated Oflag VII-C/Z. During their internment the activities of the prisoners included putting on performances of plays and sketches, including a performance of Shakespeare's Hamlet. In February 1942 the prisoners were transferred to Oflag VII-B in Eichstätt, and the castle then became an internment camp (Internierungslager) for men from the British Channel Islands of Jersey and Guernsey. As a sub-camp of Ilag VII, it was designated Ilag VII/Z. The camp was liberated in May 1945.

See also
 List of prisoner-of-war camps in Germany
Oflag VII-C in Laufen
Oflag
Ilag

References

External links
 John Bremner, 2nd Battalion, Seaforth Highlanders

 

Oflags
World War II prisoner of war camps in Germany
1941 establishments in Germany
1945 disestablishments in Germany